Paine may refer to:

Geography
Paine, Chile
Paine College, a defunct Historically Black college in Augusta, Georgia
Paine Field, an airport in Everett, Washington, United States
Paine Lake, a lake in Minnesota
Paine River, a waterstream located in the Magallanes Region of Chile
Torres del Paine, a mountain group in Chilean Patagonia
Cordillera del Paine, a mountain group in Chilean Patagonia

Other
Paine (surname)
Paine (Final Fantasy), a fictional female character in the video game Final Fantasy X-2
John Alsop Paine, botanist whose standard author abbreviation is  "Paine"
John Knowles Paine, an American-born composer
Thomas Paine, (1737-1809) activist-philosopher
Hurricane Paine, name of several storms in the Eastern Pacific Ocean

See also

Payne (disambiguation)
Pain (disambiguation)
Justice Paine (disambiguation)